The Lost Chapters is the twelfth studio album released by West Coast rapper Mr. Capone-E on October 27, 2009. The album contains songs that did not make the album Diary of a G.

Track listing

References
 http://www.cduniverse.com/productinfo.asp?pid=8002541
 http://hipowermusic.com/store/index.php?main_page=product_info&products_id=141

2009 albums
Mr. Capone-E albums